The HVDC Sileru–Barsoor is a high voltage direct current transmission system between Sileru and Barsoor in India. It is in service since 1989 as the first HVDC line in the country. The HVDC Sileru–Barsoor is a bipolar HVDC with a voltage of 200 kV and a transmission rate of 400 megawatts.

This HVDC line is not in use for a long time. On 1 January 2014, the NEW grid is synchronised with the Southern regional grid making this HVDC link redundant. 200 kV AC line of NEW grid can be directly connected to the 200 kV line of Southern grid bypassing the HVDC converter stations. Thus the energy losses taking place in the converter stations can be avoided and these HVDC converter stations can be shifted to elsewhere to export/import power from other countries.

These unused converter stations owned by APTransCo, can be used to generate hydro electricity from Srisailam Dam or Nagarjuna Sagar Dam hydro power stations when the water level in the reservoirs are below the minimum rated water head by generating power at lower/under frequency (< 50 Hz). The lower frequency power is converted to normal grid frequency power with these converter stations. Thus more water available in the dead storage of these reservoirs can be used for additional power generation to meet peaking demand in summer months.

Sites

See also
 APTransCo
 Vizag back to back HVDC converter station
 Chandrapur back to back HVDC converter station

Reference list 

HVDC transmission lines
Electric power transmission infrastructure in India
Energy in Andhra Pradesh
1989 establishments in Andhra Pradesh
2014 disestablishments in India
Energy infrastructure completed in 1989